Christian Religious Welfare Trust is a government owned trust that works for the welfare of Christian community of Bangladesh and is located in Dhaka, Bangladesh.

History
The trust was established in 2004 by the government of Bangladesh through the passage of Christian Religious Welfare Trust Ordinance. The trust is under the authority of the Ministry of Religious Affairs. In 2016, it received a 1 million taka funding from the government.

References

Government agencies of Bangladesh
2004 establishments in Bangladesh
Religious organisations based in Bangladesh
Organisations based in Dhaka
Christianity in Bangladesh